Laplante or LaPlante or la Plante is a French surname. Notable people with the surname include:

André Laplante (born 1949), Canadian pianist
Charles Laplante dit Champagne (1838–1907), lawyer, judge and political figure in Quebec
Darryl Laplante (born 1977), retired Canadian professional ice hockey centre
Deby LaPlante (born 1953), American hurdler
Joseph Normand Laplante (born 1965), federal judge for the United States District Court for the District of New Hampshire
Laurent Laplante (1934–2017), Canadian journalist and essayist
Laura La Plante (1904–1996), American film actress
Lynda La Plante (born 1943), English author, screenwriter and former actress
Mike LaPlante (born 1966), American college basketball coach
Violet La Plante (1908–1984), American film actress; sister of Laura La Plante

See also
Plante, surname

French-language surnames